Hiéville is a former commune in the Calvados department in the Normandy region in northwestern France. On 1 January 2017, it was merged into the new commune Saint-Pierre-en-Auge.

Population

Etymology

French linguist René Lepelley writes that the etymology of Hiéville is similar to that of the commune Hiesville in the Manche department.  Both names probably come from the word 'hedo' (derived from the Ancient Greek word for pleasure) and the Old French word 'ville', which originally referred to a rural estate or territory.  Ville itself was derived from the Latin phrase 'villa rustica,' a countryside home.

See also
Communes of the Calvados department

References

Former communes of Calvados (department)
Calvados communes articles needing translation from French Wikipedia
Populated places disestablished in 2017